Hitchens is a surname of early medieval English origin. Notable people with the surname include:

 Alfred Hitchens (1861–1942), English painter
 Anthony Hitchens (born 1992), American football linebacker 
 Bob Hitchens (1952–2020), American college football player
 Christopher Hitchens (1949–2011), Anglo-American author, journalist and broadcaster
 Dolores Hitchens (1907–1973), American mystery novelist
 Gerry Hitchens (1934–1983), English footballer
 Ivon Hitchens (1893–1979), English painter
 John Hitchens (born 1940), English painter
 Keith Hitchins (1931–2020), American historian
 Peter Hitchens (born 1951), British author, journalist and broadcaster
 Robert Hichens (disambiguation), various people
Robert Smythe Hichens (1864–1950), English writer, known as Robert Hichens
Robert Hichens (RMS Titanic) (1882–1940), quartermaster on the RMS Titanic
Robert Peverell Hichens (1909–1943), RNVR officer in the Second World War
 Tim Hitchens (born 1962), British diplomat

Characters
Grace Hitchens, character in Glee

Others
Hitchens's razor, an epistemological razor asserting that the burden of proof regarding the truthfulness of a claim lies with the one who makes the claim, and if this burden is not met, the claim is unfounded, and its opponents need not argue further in order to dismiss it
Hitchens Pond, pond located east of Barber Point, New York

References

See also
57901 Hitchens
Hitchen

English-language surnames
Surnames of English origin